The 1997 Zambian coup d'état attempt was a military coup d'état attempt that took place in Zambia on 28 October 1997. The coup lasted no more than 3 hours and took place between 6 and 9 A.M. when the coup's leader, Captain Solo (Steven Lungu) of the Zambian Army, announced via the ZNBC (national radio station) that a coup had taken place and that the then President, Frederick Chiluba, needed to step down.

Some international media organizations could not resist joking about the "aptly named" coup leader (Solo) whose demand that the President resign could be heard accompanied by laughter from radio journalists who were in the radio station at the time of the coup attempt. Captain Solo would spend the next 13 years in prison for committing treason and was released only when it became clear that he was terminally ill.

See also
History of Zambia
1990 Zambian coup d'état attempt

References

Coup
Zambia
Military coups in Zambia
October 1997 events in Africa
1990s coups d'état and coup attempts